Ross House, also known as John Clark House, Graceland Museum, and Audrain County Historical Museum, is a historic home located at Mexico, Audrain County, Missouri. It was built in 1857, and is a two-story, frame dwelling with Italianate style decorative features. The house is topped by a hipped roof with widow's walk. It features an imposing Classical Revival style two-story front portico.  The house is operated by the Audrain County Historical Society and adjacent to the American Saddlebred Horse Museum.

It was listed on the National Register of Historic Places in 1978.

References

Houses on the National Register of Historic Places in Missouri
Italianate architecture in Missouri
Neoclassical architecture in Missouri
Houses completed in 1857
Buildings and structures in Audrain County, Missouri
National Register of Historic Places in Audrain County, Missouri
1857 establishments in Missouri